Rocky: Original Motion Picture Score is a soundtrack album for the 1976 film Rocky, composed by Bill Conti. It was released on vinyl in the United States on November 12, 1976, by United Artists Records, followed by a CD release by EMI Records on November 7, 1988. The soundtrack is notable for its inclusion of "Gonna Fly Now", the theme song from Rocky.

Overview
Although the Conti version of "Gonna Fly Now" is the most recognizable arrangement, a cover of the song performed by legendary trumpeter Maynard Ferguson on his Conquistador album prior to the release of the motion picture soundtrack actually outsold the soundtrack itself. The version of Conti's "Gonna Fly Now" released on later records and CDs differs from the version used in the film. The vocals and guitars are much more emphasized in the film than on the versions released. The "movie version" has yet to be officially released.
Parts of the song contain phases of the old german soldier song "Fehrbelliner Reitermarsch".

Track listing
All music by Bill Conti.
 "Gonna Fly Now (Theme from Rocky)" (vocals: DeEtta Little/Nelson Pigford) – 2:48
 "Philadelphia Morning" – 2:22
 "Going the Distance" – 2:40
 "Reflections" – 3:19
 "Marines' Hymn/Yankee Doodle" (Jacques Offenbach/Thomas Holcomb/Traditional, arranged by Conti) – 1:45
 "Take You Back (Street Corner Song from Rocky)" (vocals: Valentine)(written by F. Stallone, Jr.) – 1:49
 "First Date" – 1:54
 "You Take My Heart Away" (vocals: DeEtta Little/Nelson Pigford) – 4:46
 "Fanfare for Rocky" – 2:34
 "Butkus" – 2:12
 "Alone in the Ring" – 1:09
 "The Final Bell" – 1:56
 "Rocky's Reward" – 2:03

Personnel 

 Composer, conductor, orchestrator, producer - Bill Conti
 Recording engineer - Ami Hadani

Performers (uncredited):

 The Hollywood Studio Symphony
 Trumpet - Malcolm McNab, Tony Terran, Graham Young, Maurice Harris, Robert DiVall, Uan Rasey
 Horn - Vince DeRosa, Richard Perissi, Arthur Maebe, Gale Robinson
 Trombone - Dick Nash, Lloyd Ulyate
 Bass trombone - George Roberts
 Tuba - Tommy Johnson

Chart positions

Additional music
Additional music featured in Rocky:

References

1976 soundtrack albums
1970s film soundtrack albums
Capitol Records soundtracks
Drama film soundtracks
Rocky (film series) soundtracks
United Artists Records soundtracks